Chase Fourcade (born December 17, 1997) is an American football quarterback for the Pittsburgh Maulers of the United States Football League (USFL). He played college football for Nicholls. He had stints with the Columbus Lions of the National Arena League (NAL), Calgary Stampeders of the Canadian Football League (CFL), and the Alabama Airborne of Major League Football (MLFB).

While with Nicholls, Fourcade became the school's all-time career leader in passing yards, passing touchdowns, completion percentage, total yards, rushing touchdowns, and touchdowns responsible for. He also earned two All-Southland First Team honors and a nod for All-Louisiana First Team and All-Louisiana Second Team in 2018 and 2019 respectively. He earned the honors of Southland Conference Offensive Player of the Year in back-to-back years in 2018 and 2019.

Fourcade's uncle, John Fourcade, played for Ole Miss and the New Orleans Saints of the National Football League (NFL).

Early life and high school career 
Fourcade was born on December 17, 1997 in Metairie, Louisiana. He attended, played high school football, and baseball for Archbishop Rummel High School in Jefferson Parish, Louisiana. He was a three-year starter and won two Division I state titles.

Fourcade was an All-State honorable mention and a First-Team catcher on The New Orleans Advocate's All-Metro Team.

As a sophomore in 2013, Fourcade led the Raiders to a Division I state championship.

As a junior in 2014, Fourcade led the school to an 11–1 record and was named to the NOLA.com | The Times-Picayune All-District 9-5A team. He threw for 1,652 yards and fourteen touchdowns while also rushing for 513 yards and thirteen touchdowns as the team reached the Division I semifinals.

As a senior in 2015, Fourcade earned Class 5A All-State honors and a nod for New Orleans All-Metro honorable mention list. He was also named as the 2015 Clarion-Herald Player of the Year. He was rated as a 2-star dual threat quarterback.

College career 
In 2016, Fourcade made his college football debut against FBS opponent No. 9 Georgia. He threw his first career touchdown in the third quarter to Jarrell Rogers to put the Colonels up 14–13. He threw his second touchdown pass with less than four minutes left to put the game within two but the team could not pull off the upset falling 24–26 against Jacob Eason and the Bulldogs. He finished his debut going nine of nineteen for 99 yards and two touchdowns and two interceptions. The following week against Incarnate Word he lead the team to it's first win of the season. In the 35–28 win he threw for 289 yards and two touchdowns. He would start all eleven games, including the last nine, for the fourth-most passing yards in program history with 2,482. He threw for a season-high 341 passing yards in a win over No. 22 McNeese State despite the 13–38 loss. He earned an honorable mention for All-Southland and HERO Sports FCS All-American while also finishing in sixth place for the FCS Jerry Rice Award, which is awarded to the nation's top freshman.

In 2017, Fourcade started eleven of twelve games for the Colonels. He did not start in the team's rivalry game against Northwestern State due to injury, but he would play in that game and lead the game-winning drive. To start the season he threw for three touchdowns and 213 yards in a 37–35 win over McNeese State. Against Houston Christian he threw a game-winning 44-yard touchdown to Dai'Jean Dixon to beat the Huskies 23–17. Enroute to a FCS playoff appearance the team only lost three games against Texas A&M, No. 3 Sam Houston State, and against rival Southeastern Louisiana. Against No. 16 South Dakota, in his postseason debut Fourcade threw three interceptions, including two in the first quarter. Despite the poor performance through the air the team only lost 31–38. He lead the team in rushing with 89 yards. He finished the season with an eighth-best single-season total of 2,316 yards; becoming only the second Colonel to throw for 2,000 yards in two separate seasons.

Statistics

Nicholls records
Career records:

 Passing yards: 10,707
 Passing touchdowns: 70
 Completion percentage: 59.6%
 Total yards: 12,604
 Rushing touchdowns: 35
 Touchdowns responsible for: 105
 Pass attempts: 1,350
 Completions: 804
 200-yard games: 28
 Plays: 1,875

Single season:

 Completion percentage: 67.8% (2019)

Honors 
2016

 HERO Sports FCS Freshman All-American Honorable Mention
 All-Southland Honorable Mention
 Sixth in STATS FCS Jerry Rice Award

2017

 LSWA Offensive Player of the Week (10/30)

2018

 Southland Conference Player of the Year
 All-Southland First Team
 All-Louisiana First Team
 CFPA FCS National Performer of the Year Watch List
 Southland Offensive Player of the Week (9/22)
 LSWA Offensive Player of the Week (10/30)

2019

 Southland Conference Player of the Year
 All-Southland First Team
 All-Louisiana Second Team
 Southland Offensive Player of the Week (10/5)
 2× LSWA Offensive Player of the Week (9/14, 10/5)
 STATS FCS Walter Payton Award Watch List

Professional career

Columbus Lions 
After going undrafted in the 2020 NFL Draft, Fourcade signed with the Columbus Lions of the National Arena League (NAL) on January 27, 2021. He made his debut for the Lions against the Jersey Flight after starter Mason Espinosa was pulled from the game; Fourcade came in with 1:45 left on the clock up 49–7. The team would not score while he was on the field as he missed a wide open touchdown to Lonnie Outlaw which resulted in a turnover on downs. He finished his season with the team completing six of his fifteen pass attempts for 57 yards and one touchdown.

Fourcade participated in the 2022 Louisiana Pro Day on April 5, 2022 in the New Orleans Saints facility.

Calgary Stampeders 
On April 17, 2022, Fourcade signed with the Calgary Stampeders of the Canadian Football League (CFL) and competed with fellow quarterback Tommy Stevens for the third-string spot behind Jake Maier and Bo Levi Mitchell. He was cut after the preseason following a four of six for 63 yards and a touchdown performance in a 37–7 preseason win over the Edmonton Elks.

Alabama Airborne 
In 2022, Fourcade signed with the Alabama Airborne of Major League Football (MLFB). On July 13, 2022, he reported to the league's first-ever training camp in Mobile, Alabama, with the Alabama Airborne alongside AJ Bush from Illinois and Max Meylor from Wisconsin–Whitewater. Players from the Airborne and two other teams were abruptly kicked out of the hotel they were staying at on July 28, 2022, and shortly thereafter it was announced that the league would suspend the 2022 season.

Pittsburgh Maulers 
On August 31, 2022, Fourcade signed with the Pittsburgh Maulers of the United States Football League (USFL). Heading into the 2023 USFL season he will compete with James Morgan, Connor Sampson, and Troy Williams for a roster spot and the starting role.

Personal life 
Fourcade is the son of Keith and Jill Fourcade. His uncle, John Fourcade, played for Ole Miss and the New Orleans Saints as a quarterback.

Notes

References

External links 

 Nicholls Colonels bio

Living people
American football quarterbacks
Nicholls Colonels football players
Columbus Lions players
Calgary Stampeders players
Pittsburgh Maulers (2022) players
1997 births
Players of American football from Louisiana